South Sudan Supreme Airlines is a South Sudanese airline that began operations in September 2013. The airline was formed using the fleet of Feeder Airlines, which operated two Fokker 50A's. As of May 2014 the airline had regularly scheduled flights three times a week between Juba and Entebbe.

Destinations
As of September 2022 the airline had two scheduled destinations:

Fleet

As of March 2017 the South Supreme Airlines fleet consisted of the following aircraft:

Accidents and incidents
On 20 March 2017, South Supreme Airlines Antonov An-26 aircraft was destroyed by fire after crashing at South Sudan’s Wau airport.

A Let-410 of the revived airline crashed on March 2, 2021, after take-off from Pieri Airstrip in Juba, killing ten people and causing South Sudanese President Salva Kiir Mayardit to order the suspension of the airlines' operational permits.

References

Airlines of South Sudan
Airlines established in 2013
Aviation in South Sudan
South Sudanese companies established in 2013